Bahiya Mansour Al-Hamad (born 21 June 1992) is a rifle shooter from Qatar. She was named the Best Female Athlete of the Year 2011-2012 by the Qatar Olympic Committee (QOC). She qualified for the 2010 Youth Olympic Games, where she served as the flag bearer at the Opening Ceremony.

Al-Hamad made her Olympic debut in 2012. She was the first woman to represent Qatar at the Olympics. She placed 17th of 56 at the 10 m air rifle competition and served as the Olympic flag bearer for Qatar at the Opening Ceremony.

References

1992 births
Living people
Qatari female sport shooters
Olympic shooters of Qatar
Shooters at the 2012 Summer Olympics
Shooters at the 2010 Summer Youth Olympics
Qatari sportswomen
Shooters at the 2010 Asian Games
Shooters at the 2014 Asian Games
Asian Games competitors for Qatar